Saint-Hilaire-des-Landes is a commune in the Ille-et-Vilaine department in Brittany in northwestern France.

Geography

The adjacent communes are Le Tiercent, Baillé, Saint-Étienne-en-Coglès, Saint-Sauveur-des-Landes, Saint-Marc-sur-Couesnon, and Saint-Ouen-des-Alleux.

Population

See also
Communes of the Ille-et-Vilaine department

References

External links

 Geography of Brittany
 The page of the commune on infobretagne.com

Mayors of Ille-et-Vilaine Association 

Communes of Ille-et-Vilaine